The Hispania F111, also known as the HRT F111, is a Formula One racing car developed for Hispania Racing. The car competed in the 2011 Formula One season and was the first Formula One car designed by the team as HRT's entry into the 2010 season, the F110, was designed by Dallara. Throughout 2011, the F111 was driven by Narain Karthikeyan, Vitantonio Liuzzi and Daniel Ricciardo.

Pre-season
The car's development had a chequered history before it was even built, with an arrangement with the remains of Toyota Racing to give the team access to the abandoned TF110 project falling through before it could even be completed, with Toyota citing the uncertain financial condition of the team as the leading cause in the failed joint venture. Later reports suggested that while Hispania no longer had access to the TF110, designer Geoff Willis had been given access to the technical plans of the car for long enough to incorporate ideas from the TF110 into the F111 chassis. Driver Narain Karthikeyan later admitted that the F111 would largely be based on its predecessor, the Hispania F110.

The team set a provisional launch date of 3 March, however, the car was not unveiled until 11 March at the final pre-season test in Barcelona. The team was unable to conduct any testing as key suspension parts that had been flown into the country had not been released by Spanish customs. This made Hispania the twelfth and final team to launch their 2011 car. The late launch date of the car, after the cancellation of the test at the Bahrain International Circuit, one week before the first race of the season, meant that the launch was postponed by just over one week.

The team employed Hollywood concept vehicle designer Daniel Simon – known for his work on the 2011 film Tron: Legacy – to design the car's livery.

Performance

The F111 completed its first timed lap in the last 10 minutes of the third practice session of the 2011 Australian Grand Prix, driven by Karthikeyan. In qualifying later that day, the car failed to qualify within 107% of pacesetter Sebastian Vettel and was not allowed to start the race. During this race weekend the F111 lacked its nose and front wing which had not then passed crash tests. The car therefore used those that had been designed for the F110. From the next race in  the correct wing and nose were fitted. The F111 was then able to qualify comfortably within the 107% time, however both cars retired with technical problems.

In the next two races, both cars managed to finish the race. In Monaco both drivers crashed in practice and did not enter qualifying, however they were allowed to start the race. Liuzzi finished 16th and Karthikeyan 17th, taking advantage of multiple retirements. In Canada  the team enjoyed their best race to date with Liuzzi and Karthikeyan finishing in 13th and 14th places respectively, ahead of both Virgin drivers and one of the Lotus. However, Karthikeyan was given a post-race penalty which demoted him to 17th place.

Neither Ricciardo or Liuzzi finished better than 18th in any race.

On 22 October 2011, a few days before the inaugural Indian Grand Prix, Hispania announced that Karthikeyan would drive in place of Liuzzi rather than Ricciardo. Despite picking up damage in the first lap of the race, Karthikeyan managed to beat Ricciardo by 31.8 seconds in the race to finish 17th. Liuzzi returned to replace Karthikeyan for the final two races.

Hispania finished 11th in the World Constructors' Championship, ahead of Virgin.

Complete Formula One results
(key)

References

Hispania Formula One cars